Keren – Vocational Rehabilitation Centers in Israel is an Israeli public trust organization dedicated to vocational rehabilitation. Founded in 1964 by the Ministry of Welfare & Social Services, it hosts vocational assessment units and rehabilitation centers throughout Israel.

The Keren VRC Network consists of 14 Vocational Rehabilitation Centers, 4 Youth Vocational Rehabilitation Centers, 5 Computer Aided Training, Education and Communication (CTEC) Karten Centers and 47 supported employment and sheltered work enclaves.

The Keren is geared by the belief that every human being has an equal right to actively and fully participate in society and that work is a central feature of participation and inclusion, as well as crucial facet of a person's self-esteem and quality of life.

Target Populations
The Keren Works with people with physical, sensorial, emotional, mental and developmental disabilities, either from birth or of recent onset. The Keren also works with people with employment barriers, such as new immigrants, chronically unemployed individuals, single mothers and troubled or disabled youth.

References

External links
 keren

Medical and health organizations based in Israel
Vocational rehabilitation